Bernard Ming-Deh Harrison (born 1951) is a zoologist who was the executive director of the Singapore Zoo from 1981 to 2002.

Early life
Harrison was born in Malaysia. His father, John Leonard Harrison, was a retired major in the British army and a zoologist who specialised in rodent-borne disease, doing research in both Malaysia and Queensland, Australia. He had a D.Sc from Imperial College, University of London and was Professor of Zoology at the Universit of Singapore. His mother, Song Kiew Ying, was a former nurse. The junior Harrison studied a double degree in zoology and psychology at the University of Manchester, and returned to Singapore in 1973 to work as a curator of zoology at the Singapore Zoological Gardens. In 1987 he obtained a M.Sc. in zoo design from the National University of Singapore, for which he studied part time.

Harrison was interviewed and hired by the Zoo's Chairman, Dr Ong Swee Law in 1973 as Assistant Adminstrative Officer and was quickly promoted to Curator of Zoology.  Subsequently Harrison was promoted to Executive Director in 1980, Chief Executive in 1994 and CEO of Wildlife Reserves Singapore (a merger of the Singapore Zoo and Jurong Bird Park) in 1999. Harrison worked well with a range of zoo design consultants, especially Lyn de Alwis (who designed the Singapore Zoo and conceived the Night Safari), David Hancocks, Simon Corder and Roger Sherman. In 1987 he commenced work under the guidance of Dr Ong and de Alwis on the Night Safari, which opened in 1994, the first of its kind in the world. With his Zoo team which included  Mike Graetz, the Head of Creative Design Team; Wong Joon Tong of Maintenance and Design; Subash Chandran, Head of Zoology; Melvin Tan Head of Horticulture and external architect May Chan, Consultants Incorporated Architects and Planners, Harrison developed a derth of new and great animal exhibits during his teneur including the Reptile Garden, Fragile Forest, Tree Tops Trail, Primate Kingdom, Pools Amphitheatre, Elephants of Asia and the Baboons of Ethiopia. Harrison also established the Department of Conservation and Research and the Conservation Fund. Harrison's passion for the development of open styled Balinese toilets complete with gardens and landscape features was first seen in Children's World. These Balinese toilets would be a feature of all furute toilet developments in WRS.

On 2 July 2002, he announced his resignation which was accepted by his current Chairman Dr Kwa Soon Bee. He was succeeded by Singapore Tourism Board marketing director Asad Shiraz. During Harrison's tenure, the Singapore Zoo saw record-breaking attendance; according to the BBC, it became "one of the most successful in Asia with its open concept of animal display." In an interview with The Straits Times, he described the last couple of years at the zoo as "pretty bloody boring". The Straits Times writer Yong Hui Mien described Harrison as "Singapore's Doctor Dolittle", although the zoo's celebrity orangutan Ah Meng reportedly disliked him.

The Zoo and Night Safari also won numerous awards both locally and regionally. and ranked in the top 10 best zoos worldwide in Trip Advisor.
  
Harrison opined that a majority of zoos worldwide were mismanaged: "If I could, I would shut down 90% of the 10,000 zoos in the world. The world is full of horrible stink holes that call themselves zoos." A biography of Harrison, written by Singapore Management University English literature professor Kirpal Singh and titled Naked Ape, Naked Boss, was published in 2014.

Personal life
In his thirties, Harrison wrote a novel titled Malacca and Beyond to Catch Me a Star (Media Masters 1983 and 2002), as well as an unpublished poetry anthology whose working title was No Leaf Unturned. In 1997, Harrison separated from his second wife, landscape gardener Nazli; He attributed the failure of their ten-year marriage to his working long hours at the zoo. Harrison has two children with Nazli, a daughter Sharda Maxine and a son Sean Leonard Harrison.  In 2002, he married corporate trainer Tina Lim, with whom he established the zoo design consultancy Bernard Harrison & Friends Ltd.

References

 Sharp, Ilsa (1994) The First 21 Years The Singapore Zoological Garden Story, Published by Singapore Zoological Gardens,

Further reading

 

1951 births
21st-century Singaporean people
Living people